The Song Poet (2016) is a memoir by Kao Kalia Yang, published by Metropolitan Press. It won the MN Book Award in creative nonfiction/memoir and was a finalist for both the National Book Critics Circle Award and the Chautauqua Prize.

References 

Hmong-American culture in Minnesota
Hmong-American culture and history
Asian-American art
Asian-American literature